"The Woman in My Life" is a song recorded by American country music artist Phil Vassar. It was released in August 2006 as the second single from his compilation album Greatest Hits, Vol. 1. Vassar co-wrote the song with then-wife Julie Wood.

Critical reception
The song received a favorable review from Deborah Evans Price of Billboard, who wrote that it has "a great lyric with a lovely sentiment that audiences will readily connect with."

Chart performance
The song debuted at number 56 on the U.S. Billboard Hot Country Songs chart for the week of August 19, 2006.

References

2006 singles
2006 songs
Phil Vassar songs
Arista Nashville singles
Songs written by Phil Vassar
Song recordings produced by Frank Rogers (record producer)